Bruchstedt is a municipality in the Unstrut-Hainich-Kreis district of Thuringia, Germany.

History 
At the beginning of the 9th century Bruchstedt was first mentioned in a directory of the Patrimony of the Archbishop Lullus († 786), Hersfeld Abbey as  Brutstede  in context with Tennstedt. ( Dennistede )

Bruchstedt was affected in 1663 by the witch-hunt. Anna Maria Lorenzen  got into a witch-hunt and was punished with banishment.

1816 came Bruchstedt due to the Congress of Vienna  to the Kreis Langensalza of the Prussian Province of Saxony.

On the night of 23 May to 24 May 1950, due to a severe weather a flash flood devastated  the place. Water heights height up to 3.50 meters have been achieved. Eight citizens and most of the livestock were victims of the disaster. In a state-organized effort the place was re-built by 3000 workers within 50 days. Of the disaster night remembers a memorial stone with the names of the eight victims. Every year a party takes place in memory of the unique solidarity action.

References

Unstrut-Hainich-Kreis